The 2020–21 AZ Alkmaar season was the club's 54th season in existence and the 23rd consecutive season in the top flight of Dutch football. In addition to the domestic league, AZ participated in this season's editions of the KNVB Cup, the UEFA Champions League and the UEFA Europa League. The season covered the period from 1 July 2020 to 30 June 2021.

On 5 December 2020, manager Arne Slot was sacked following rumors that he was negotiating to become the new manager of Feyenoord for the following season.

Players

First-team squad

Out on loan

Other players under contract

Transfers

In

Out

Pre-season and friendlies

Competitions

Overview

Eredivisie

League table

Results summary

Results by round

Matches
The league fixtures were announced on 24 July 2020.

KNVB Cup

UEFA Champions League

Qualifying rounds

UEFA Europa League

Group stage

The group stage draw was held on 2 October 2020.

Statistics

Squad statistics
Last updated on 27 December 2020.

|-
! colspan="14" style="background:#dcdcdc; text-align:center"|Goalkeepers

|-
! colspan="14" style="background:#dcdcdc; text-align:center"|Defenders

|-
! colspan="14" style="background:#dcdcdc; text-align:center"|Midfielders

|-
! colspan="14" style="background:#dcdcdc; text-align:center"|Forwards

|-
! colspan=14 style=background:#dcdcdc; text-align:center|Players who have made an appearance this season but have left the club

|}

Goalscorers

References

External links

AZ Alkmaar seasons
AZ Alkmaar
AZ Alkmaar
2020–21 UEFA Europa League participants seasons